Pischelsdorf am Engelbach is a municipality in the district of Braunau am Inn in the Austrian state of Upper Austria.

Geography
Pischelsdorf lies in the Innviertel. About 31 percent of the municipality is forest and 65 percent farmland.

References

Cities and towns in Braunau am Inn District